The 1937–38 Cypriot First Division was the 4th season of the Cypriot top-level football league.

Overview
It was contested by 5 teams, and APOEL F.C. won the championship.

League standings

Results

References
Cyprus - List of final tables (RSSSF)

Cypriot First Division seasons
Cypriot
1937–38 in Cypriot football